Jakov Vladović (born 17 April 1983) is a Croatian professional basketball coach and former basketball player. Standing at 1.87 m, he played at the point guard position.

Professional career
Vladović began his career in Zadar. He spent there six seasons during which we won the Adriatic League, the Croatian League and four Croatian Cups.

In the summer of 2007 he moved to Zagreb. In his first season there, he wins another Croatian Cup. During the 2008–09 season he had a lot of health problems, which is why he missed a significant number of games. In the Adriatic League he played only 11 games with an average of 10.8 points, two assists and 2.3 rebounds in 24:42 minutes. At the end of the season he left KK Zagreb and agreed to a one-year collaboration with Russian top-level club Lokomotiv Rostov.

In 2010, he returns to Zadar, now playing as the captain of the team (11.7 points, 4.3 rebounds, 2.9 assists in the Adriatic League). 
The next season, he played at the Bosnian Široki Wwin and won the Bosnian League and Cup.

The 2012–13 season the spent at Krka, participating in the Adriatic League (8.3 points, 4.0 rebounds, 4.3 assists), EuroChallenge (10.7 points, 4.8 rebounds, 3.5 assists ) and winning the Slovenian League.

In October 2013, he signed with Union Olimpija.

In December 2014, he signed with the Lithuanian team Lietkabelis.

In March 2015, Vladović once more returned to Zagreb.

After one season spent in Zagreb, Vladović once again returns to Zadar. This time he spent two seasons in Zadar. The better part of the 2017–18 season he missed due to injury.

In September 2018 he signed with the second hometown club of his career, Jazine Arbanasi. After playing only one game for them in the Croatian League, he signed another short-term contract with another team playing in the Croatian League, Hermes Analitica.

On 4 January 2019, he parted ways with Hermes Analitica and signed for Cedevita to play in the club's "B team" competing in the Croatian League.

On 12 August 2019, he signed with GKK Šibenka.

In September 2020, Vladović signed with his home town club Sonik-Puntamika playing in the Croatian League.

In August 2021, Vladović announced his retirement from his basketball career at age 38.

Coaching career
In the Summer of 2021, Vladović was named the assistant coach of the team in which he ended his playing career, Sonik-Puntamika.

Croatian national team
Vladović was a member of the Croatian national team B, which won the gold medal at the 2009 Mediterranean Games in Pescara.

References

External links
 Jakov Vladović at aba-liga.com
 Jakov Vladović at fiba.com

1983 births
Living people
ABA League players
BC Lietkabelis players
Competitors at the 2009 Mediterranean Games
Croatian expatriate sportspeople in Lithuania
Croatian men's basketball players
HKK Široki players
KK Cedevita players
KK Krka players
KK Olimpija players
KK Zadar players
KK Zagreb players
PBC Lokomotiv-Kuban players
Mediterranean Games gold medalists for Croatia
Mediterranean Games medalists in basketball
Point guards
Basketball players from Zadar
KK Šibenik players
KK Borik Puntamika players
KK Jazine Arbanasi players